Colegio Arturo Prat is a Chilean high school located in Machalí, Cachapoal Province, Chile.

References 

1982 establishments in Chile
Educational institutions established in 1982
Secondary schools in Chile
Schools in Cachapoal Province